William Henry Ferguson  (6 June 1880 – 22 September 1957) is one of the best-known cricket scorers. For 52 years from 1905 until his death, Ferguson acted as the scorer and baggageman for Australia, England, West Indies, South Africa and New Zealand in 43 tours and 208 Test matches.

He is often credited with two of the most revolutionary innovations in scoring. He developed the radial scoring chart, which shows the directions in which a batsman scored his runs. Originally called "Ferguson's charts", they are now popularly known as "wagon-wheels". He was one of the first scorers to use a linear system of scoring which, unlike the conventional system, keeps track of the balls faced by a batsman and off a particular bowler. In order to record such details, including the times of significant events during an innings, he designed his own scoring books – "which contain[ed] at least twice as much information as any other in the world" – and had them printed at his own expense. At the same time he also filled in a conventional scoring book for official use. He retained his own scoring books.

He received the British Empire Medal in 1951. He scored for the West Indian cricket team in England in 1957 at the beginning of the tour, but had to give up during the tour after a bad fall. He died at his home in Bath, Somerset, a few weeks later. He published his autobiography, Mr Cricket, a few months before his death.

References

References

Biography in The Cricket Country

1880 births
1957 deaths
Sportspeople from Sydney
Cricket scorers
Recipients of the British Empire Medal